Aliyar Reservoir is a  reservoir located in Aliyar village near Pollachi town in Coimbatore District, Tamil Nadu, South India. The dam is located in the foothills of Valparai, in the Anaimalai Hills of the Western Ghats. The dam offers some ideal getaways including a park, garden, aquarium, play area and a mini Theme-Park maintained by Tamil Nadu Fisheries Corporation for visitors enjoyment. The scenery is beautiful, with mountains surrounding three quarters of the reservoir. Boating is also available.

History
The Aliyar Dam was constructed during 1959-1969 across the Aliyar river, mainly for irrigation purposes. Aliyar Dam was inaugurated on 2 October 1962 (Gandhi Jayanti day) by then Prime minister of India, Pandit Jawaharlal Nehru, K Kamaraj, the Chief Minister of Tamil Nadu state presided over the function. The project was commissioned in September 2002 to generate Hydro Electric Power.

Hydrography

Aliyar lake receives water from Upper Aliyar Reservoir through the hydroelectric power station in Navamali and the Parambikulam reservoir through a contour canal. Aliyar dam, built as a part of Parambikulam aliyar project (PAP), retains a large reservoir.

The volume of water at FRL is 3.864 Tmcft. The volume development is 1.2 m. The highest inflow usually occurs during July and August. The shoreline is poorly indented, the shore development is poor and shallow and the Aquatic plants and limnology of the littoral zone is also very limited.

Fisheries
Ailyar reservoir was studied by the Central Inland Fisheries Research Institute (CFRI) for eleven years from 1982 to 1992. The rate of energy conversion at primary producer level and at the fish production level at Aliyar is considered higher than in any other Indian reservoir. The indigenous fish of the reservoir includes 40 species belonging to 13 families, plus seven stocked species

Hydel Power Project 

This project consists of a series of dams interconnected by tunnels and canals for harnessing the waters of the Parambikulam, Aliyar, Sholiyar, Thunakadavu, Thekkadi and Palar rivers, flowing at various elevations, for irrigation and power generation. The scheme is an outstanding example of engineering skill. At present, the discharges are being let down through three sets of sluices/ canals, viz., Pollachi Canal, Vettaikaranpudur Canal and the river sluices.  Under this scheme, the irrigation discharges let down through river sluices of the Aliyar Dam utilized for power generation in a power house at the toe of the dam.  Being a micro hydel scheme, this project is subsidized by the Ministry of Non-conventional Energy Sources, Government of India.

Visitor information

Aliyar dam is a popular tourist destination. Near Aliyar dam are some visitor attractions including a park, garden, aquarium, play area and a mini Theme-Park maintained by Tamil Nadu Fisheries Corporation for visitors enjoyment. Temple of Consciousness is situated near Aliyar dam entrance at  Arutperunjothi Nagar, where Vethathiri Maharishi resides. The scenery is beautiful, with mountains surrounding three quarters of the reservoir. Boating is also available. Monkey Falls is located at 6 km from the dam next to Arutperunjothi Nagar and Forest Department Checkpost. Overnight stay is possible in the forest rest house.  A treetop house provides accommodation for the adventurous. The Dam and Park and the overall surroundings of the dam are very poorly maintained as of 2017.

See also 
 List of dams and reservoirs in India
 Valparai

References 

Reservoirs in Tamil Nadu
Dams in Tamil Nadu
Dams completed in 1969
Geography of Coimbatore
1969 establishments in Tamil Nadu
20th-century architecture in India